The Samuel Gompers Memorial is a bronze statue in Washington, D.C., listed on the National Register of Historic Places.
It is located at the intersection of 10th Street, L Street, and Massachusetts Avenue, Northwest, Washington, D.C.
The statue is in memory of Samuel Gompers, an English-born American cigar maker, labor union leader and a key figure in American labor history.

Inscriptions  
The inscription on the southeast side reads, "So long as we have held fast to voluntary principles and have been actuated and inspired by the spirit of service, we have sustained our forward progress and we have made our labor movement something to be respected and accorded a place in the councils of our republic.  Where we have blundered into trying to force a policy or a decision even though wise and right, we have impeded if not interrupted the realization of our own aims."  

On the southwest side it reads, "No lasting gain has ever come from compulsion.  If we seek to force, we but tear apart that which united is invincible. There is no way whereby our labor movement may be assured and sustained progress in determining its policies and its plans other than sincere democratic deliberation until a unanimous decision is reached.  This may seem a cumbrous, slow method to the impatient, but the impatient are more concerned for immediate triumph than for the education of constructive development."  

On the back side, it reads, "Say to the organized workers of America that as I have kept the faith I expect that they will keep the faith.  They must carry on.  Say to them that a union man carrying a card is not a good citizen unless he upholds the institutions of our country and a poor citizen of our country if he upholds the institutions of our country and forgets the obligations of his trade association."

See also
 List of public art in Washington, D.C., Ward 2 
 National Register of Historic Places listings in central Washington, D.C.

References

External links
 
 "Samuel Gompers Memorial", dcmemorials.com

Statues in Washington, D.C.
Neoclassical sculptures
1933 sculptures
Monuments and memorials on the National Register of Historic Places in Washington, D.C.
Bronze sculptures in Washington, D.C.
Outdoor sculptures in Washington, D.C.
1933 establishments in Washington, D.C.
Mount Vernon Square